Frost, Briggs & Chamberlain, later Frost & Chamberlain and Frost, Chamberlain & Edwards, was an early 20th century architectural firm out of Worcester, Massachusetts.

History
Frost, Briggs & Chamberlain was established in 1899 as the partnership of architects Howard Frost, Lucius W. Briggs and C. Leslie Chamberlain. It soon rose to be the city's most prominent firm of architects. In 1912 the initial partnership was dissolved when Briggs left to form his own firm, the L. W. Briggs Company. Frost and Chamberlain continued as the firm of Frost & Chamberlain. After eleven years, Lester B. Edwards was admitted to the partnership in 1923. He had been with the firm since about 1920. When exactly the firm was dissolved is unknown, but it was active as late as 1939.

On his own, Briggs eventually became the city's most prominent architect, taking with him much of the prestige of Frost, Briggs & Chamberlain. Frost & Chamberlain and Frost, Chamberlain & Edwards continued to do significant work in Worcester, but rarely on the same level.

The noted American architect Wallace K. Harrison, a native of Worcester, was employed by Frost & Chamberlain between 1913 and 1916.

Partner biographies

Howard Frost
Howard Frost was born in 1859. His early education is unknown, but he entered Harvard University in 1878. In 1879, at the close of his freshman year, he dropped out, taking a job with Fuller & Delano in Worcester. He made partner in 1895, the firm being renamed Fuller, Delano & Frost. This partnership continued until 1899, when he formed Frost, Briggs & Chamberlain with Lucius W. Briggs and C. Leslie Chamberlain.

Frost remained associated with this firm and its successors until his death, which occurred on January 9, 1946 in Worcester.

Lucius W. Briggs
Lucius Wallace Briggs was born August 26, 1866 in Worcester. After attending the public schools and completing a special course at the Massachusetts Institute of Technology, he worked for architects Barker & Nourse and Fuller & Delano and contractors Norcross Brothers. In 1896 he opened his own office, associating with Frost and Chamberlain in 1899. After the partnership was dissolved in 1912, Briggs organized his own firm, the L. W. Briggs Company.

Briggs died in Worcester, September 10, 1940.

C. Leslie Chamberlain
Nothing is known of the background of C. Leslie Chamberlain.

Lester B. Edwards
Little is known about Lester B. Edwards. Before joining Frost & Chamberlain, he was employed as a draftsman by the L. W. Briggs Company and then as the chief draftsman of the Central Building Company, a contracting firm. He had joined Frost & Chamberlain by 1920, making partner in 1923.

Works

Frost, Briggs & Chamberlain, 1899-1912
 1899 - South High School, 14 Richards St, Worcester, Massachusetts
 1900 - Grafton High School, 17 Worcester St, Grafton, Massachusetts
 Demolished
 1901 - Forbush Memorial Library, 118 Main St, Westminster, Massachusetts
 1902 - Clubhouse, Tatnuck Country Club, 1222 Pleasant St, Worcester, Massachusetts
 1902 - University Library, Clark University, Worcester, Massachusetts
 Presently the Jefferson Academic Center
 1904 - Dexter Memorial Town Hall (Former), 40 Main St, Charlton, Massachusetts
 1904 - Leominster High School (Old), 261 West St, Leominster, Massachusetts
 1905 - Chandler Bullock House, 41 Sever St, Worcester, Massachusetts
 1905 - Carnegie Hall, St. Lawrence University, Canton, New York
 1907 - Slater Building, 390 Main St, Worcester, Massachusetts
 1908 - Walter E. Hassam House, 2 Beeching St, Worcester, Massachusetts
 1909 - Gardner Savings Bank Building, 29 Parker St, Gardner, Massachusetts
 1909 - Worcester Technical High School (Old), 34 Grove St, Worcester, Massachusetts
 1910 - Fritz H. Small House, 38 Berwick St, Worcester, Massachusetts
 1912 - Beaman Memorial Public Library, 8 Newton St, West Boylston, Massachusetts

Frost & Chamberlain, 1912-1923
 1913 - Leominister Municipal Building, 25 West St, Leominster, Massachusetts
 1914 - Worcester Boys' Club (Old), 2 Ionic Ave, Worcester, Massachusetts
 1918 - David Hale Fanning Trade School for Girls (Former), 24 Chatham St, Worcester, Massachusetts
 1922 - Massachusetts Protective Association Building, 18 Chestnut St, Worcester, Massachusetts

Frost, Chamberlain & Edwards, from 1923
1925 -  Worcester Chamber of Commerce Building, 32 Franklin St, Worcester, Massachusetts
 1926 - Duncan & Goodell Realty Building, 34 Mechanic St, Worcester, Massachusetts
 1928 - M. E. Tuller Showroom, 6 Park Ave, Worcester, Massachusetts
 1928 - Worcester Boys' Club (Former), 2 Grove St, Worcester, Massachusetts
 1929 - William H. Dolan House, 53 Highland Ave, Fitchburg, Massachusetts
 1930 - Administration Building, Worcester State Teachers College, Worcester, Massachusetts
 1931 - Worcester County Hospital, Hospital Dr, Boylston, Massachusetts
 Demolished in 2006
 1932 - Heard Street School, 200 Heard St, Worcester, Massachusetts
 1933 - Butterick School, 1 Park St, Sterling, Massachusetts

References

Architecture firms based in Massachusetts
Companies based in Worcester, Massachusetts